The Senegalese Democratic Party is a political party in Senegal.  The party considers itself a liberal party and is a member of the Liberal International. Abdoulaye Wade, who was President of Senegal from 2000 to 2012, is the party's leader. The PDS ruled together with smaller parties as part of the Sopi Coalition. Since Wade's defeat in the 2012 presidential election, the PDS has been the main opposition party.

History
At a summit of the Organization of African Unity in Mogadishu in 1974, Wade told President Léopold Sédar Senghor that he wanted to start a new party, and Senghor agreed to this. The PDS was founded on 31 July 1974 and recognized on 8 August. In its first constitutive congress, held on 31 January – 1 February 1976, the PDS described itself as a party of labor, but soon afterwards a law was introduced according to which three parties were allowed in Senegal: a socialist party, a Marxist–Leninist party, and a liberal party. The first two categories were already taken, and the PDS assumed the role of a liberal party rather than be dissolved.

Abdoulaye Wade is the Secretary General of the PDS and has led the party since its foundation in 1974. The PDS joined the Liberal International at the latter's Berlin Congress in 1980.

The PDS participated, along with the ruling Socialist Party, in a national unity government that was formed in 1991, but withdrew from it on October 20, 1992, saying that the Socialist Party had monopolized control of the government and marginalized the PDS. Wade ran against the Socialist incumbent, Abdou Diouf, in the February 1993 presidential election, but lost to Diouf, receiving 32% of the vote against Diouf's 58%. In the subsequent May 1993 parliamentary election, the PDS won 27 out of 120 seats in the National Assembly. The PDS and the Socialist Party began discussing the formation of another government together, but this was aborted by the assassination of Constitutional Council vice-president Babacar Sèye on May 15; because the PDS had been critical of Sèye, they were suspected of responsibility for the killing. The PDS then joined the Bokk Sopi Senegaal opposition coalition, in which it remained until rejoining the government in March 1995.

Between 2005 and 2012 the PDS was associated with the international party network Alliance of Democrats. Within Senegal, the party has been part of the Patriotic Front for the Defence of the Republic since 2014 with And-Jëf/African Party for Democracy and Socialism.

After running alone in the 2012 election, the PDS contested the following elections as part of opposition alliances, Manko Wattu Sénégal in 2017 and Wallu Sénégal in 2022. The party succeeded in gradually increasing its parliamentary representation, up to 24 MPs in 2022, but didn't prevent Macky Sall from forming a government after both elections.

Electoral history

Presidential elections 

Wade ran in every presidential election from 1978 to 2012, finally becoming elected President of Senegal in 2000 against incumbent President Abdou Diouf. Wade was reelected in the first round of the 2007 election, but went on to lose the 2012 election to incumbent President Macky Sall.

National Assembly elections

See also 
Liberal Pupils and Students Movement

References

External links
Official website

Political parties in Senegal
1974 establishments in Senegal
Political parties established in 1974
Liberal International
Liberal parties in Senegal